2019 Champions League may refer to:

Football
2018–19 UEFA Champions League
2019–20 UEFA Champions League
2019 AFC Champions League
2018–19 CAF Champions League
2019–20 CAF Champions League